Torpedo Junction may refer to:

 The Battle of the Santa Cruz Islands
 Torpedo Junction, a 1989 military history book by Homer Hickam